The 2016–17 UEFA Women's Champions League knockout phase began on 5 October 2016 and concluded on 1 June 2017 with the final at the Cardiff City Stadium in Cardiff, Wales, which decided the champions of the 2016–17 UEFA Women's Champions League. A total of 32 teams competed in the knockout phase.

Lyon successfully defended their title after defeating Paris Saint-Germain in the final 7–6 on penalties after a goalless draw.

Times from 30 October 2016 up to 25 March 2017 (round of 16 and quarter-finals first legs) are CET (UTC+1), all other times are CEST (UTC+2).

Round and draw dates
The schedule of the competition is as follows (all draws are held at the UEFA headquarters in Nyon, Switzerland).

Format
The knockout phase involved 32 teams: 23 teams which qualified directly, and the nine group winners from the qualifying round.

Each tie in the knockout phase, apart from the final, was played over two legs, with each team playing one leg at home. The team that scores more goals on aggregate over the two legs advanced to the next round. If the aggregate score was level, the away goals rule was applied, i.e. the team that scored more goals away from home over the two legs advanced. If away goals were also equal, then 30 minutes of extra time was played. The away goals rule was again applied after extra time, i.e. if there were goals scored during extra time and the aggregate score was still level, the visiting team advanced by virtue of more away goals scored. If no goals were scored during extra time, the tie was decided by penalty shoot-out. In the final, which was played as a single match, if scores were level at the end of normal time, extra time was played, followed by penalty shoot-out if scores remained tied.

The mechanism of the draws for each round is as follows:
In the draw for the round of 32, the sixteen teams with the highest UEFA coefficients were seeded (with the title holders being the automatic top seed), and the other sixteen teams were unseeded. The seeded teams were drawn against the unseeded teams, with the seeded teams hosting the second leg. Teams from the same association could not be drawn against each other.
In the draw for the round of 16, the eight teams with the highest UEFA coefficients were seeded (with the title holders being the automatic top seed should they qualify), and the other eight teams were unseeded. The seeded teams were drawn against the unseeded teams, with the order of legs decided by draw. Teams from the same association could not be drawn against each other.
In the draws for the quarter-finals onwards, there were no seedings, and teams from the same association could be drawn against each other.

Qualified teams
Below are the 32 teams which participate in the knockout phase (with their 2016 UEFA club coefficients, which took into account their performance in European competitions from 2011–12 to 2015–16 plus 33% of their association coefficient from the same time span).

Bracket

Round of 32
The draw for the round of 32 was held on 1 September 2016, 13:30 CEST, at the UEFA headquarters in Nyon, Switzerland.

Notes

Overview

The first legs were played on 5 and 6 October, and the second legs on 12 and 13 October 2016.

|}

Matches

Zürich won 9–0 on aggregate.

Rosengård won 1–0 on aggregate.

Paris Saint-Germain won 5–4 on aggregate.

Lyon won 10–2 on aggregate.

Eskilstuna United DFF won 3–1 on aggregate.

Rossiyanka won 2–1 on aggregate.

Wolfsburg won 4–1 on aggregate.

Twente won 5–1 on aggregate.

Slavia Praha won 4–3 on aggregate.

Fortuna Hjørring won 4–3 on aggregate.

Barcelona won 5–1 on aggregate.

6–6 on aggregate. Brescia won on away goals.

Manchester City won 6–0 on aggregate.

BIIK Kazygurt won 4–2 on aggregate.

Bayern Munich won 10–1 on aggregate.

Brøndby won 4–2 on aggregate.

Round of 16
The draw for the round of 16 was held on 17 October 2016, 13:30 CEST, at the UEFA headquarters in Nyon, Switzerland.

Overview

The first legs were played on 9 and 10 November, and the second legs played on 16 and 17 November 2016.

|}

Notes

Matches

Paris Saint-Germain won 7–1 on aggregate.

Barcelona won 5–0 on aggregate.

Rosengård won 6–1 on aggregate.

Manchester City won 2–1 on aggregate.

Fortuna Hjørring won 4–1 on aggregate.

Lyon won 17–0 on aggregate.

Wolfsburg won 8–1 on aggregate.

Bayern Munich won 8–0 on aggregate.

Quarter-finals
The draws for the quarter-finals and semi-finals were held on 25 November 2016, 13:30 CET, at the UEFA headquarters in Nyon, Switzerland.

Overview

The first legs were played on 22 and 23 March, and the second legs on 29 and 30 March 2017.

|}

Matches

Manchester City won 2–0 on aggregate.

Barcelona won 3–0 on aggregate.

Lyon won 2–1 on aggregate.

Paris Saint-Germain won 4–1 on aggregate.

Semi-finals

Overview

The first legs were played on 22 April, and the second legs on 29 April 2017.

|}

Matches

Paris Saint-Germain won 5–1 on aggregate.

Lyon won 3–2 on aggregate.

Final

The final was played on 1 June 2017 at the Cardiff City Stadium in Cardiff, Wales. The "home" team (for administrative purposes) was determined by an additional draw held after the quarter-final and semi-final draws.

References

External links
2016–17 UEFA Women's Champions League

2